James Trail (19 December 1745 - 16 August 1808) was a British lawyer and Tory politician, serving as the Member of Parliament for Orford between 1802 and 1806.

Early life 
Trail was a graduate of University of Glasgow before then going on to achieve an LLB at the Middle Temple.

Personal life 
His brother, Henry Trail, was also a MP. In 1798, he married Clarissa Catherine Trail.

References 

1745 births
1808 deaths
Members of the Middle Temple
Alumni of the University of Glasgow
UK MPs 1802–1806
Tory members of the Parliament of the United Kingdom